The 3rd edition of Miss Iraq was held on May 25, 2017 in Baghdad. Vian Sulaimani from Sulaymaniyah representing Karkh region of Baghdad was crowned as Miss Iraq 2017.

Results

Delegates
15 girls representing different regions competed in the national beauty contest.

References

External links 
 Official website
 Official facebook

2017 in Iraq
Iraq
Beauty pageants in Iraq
May 2017 events in Iraq